Jaranah is a sub-district located in Ba'dan District, Ibb Governorate, Yemen. Jaranah had a population of 4374 as of 2004.

References 

Sub-districts in Ba'dan District